And & End is the sixth extended play by South Korean girl group T-ara, which was released on September 11, 2014 by Core Contents Media.

Release
On August 6, 2014, it was revealed that the group would be returning with a new album the following month, with their label later confirming a mid-September release date. The title track, "Sugar Free", is an electronic dance music (EDM)-inspired song of the big room genre and was produced by Shinsadong Tiger, who had worked with the group on previous releases including "Roly-Poly", "Lovey-Dovey", and "Number 9", and Beom & Nang. Core Contents Media released a stand-alone single of "Sugar-Free" on 24 September 2014.  The stand-alone single featured the "BigRoom Version" of Sugar-Free as well as various remixes of the single. The "BigRoom Version" was promoted as the primary version of "Sugar Free" and released to media outlets and radio.

Reception

Critical reception 
Sugar-Free received generally positive reviews. Scott Interrante of PopMatters praised the song's synths use and the "saccharine and overly processed" vocals "Sugar-Free is as good as one could hope it to be".

Commercial performance 
And & End debuted at number two on the Gaon Album Chart for the week of September 7, 2014. In the United States, the album debuted at number 12 on the Billboard World Albums chart. As of December 2014, the album has sold 20,677 copies.

On May 19, 2016, YinYueTai announced Top 15 MVs with the most views on YinYueTai. In this list, T-ara ranked first and second with two music videos " No.9 " (133 million views)  and "Sugar Free" (122.8 million views).

Track listing

EDM Club Sugar Free Edition

Release 
EDM Club Sugar Free Edition is the second remix album by South Korean girl group T-ara , which was released on September 24, 2014.

The album consisted of a total of 18 tracks; all remixes of "Sugar Free" in Korean and English. The original version of the song featuring LE of EXID was also included on the album.

On October 9, a representative of T-ara said: We only released a limited edition of the EDM Edition album of 7,000 copies, but fans in Southeast Asia Ordered nearly 20,000 copies. We are very surprised and grateful for the interest of the fans, as this album was planned to be a limited release only, we decided not to release any more.

Charts

Weekly charts

Year-end charts

Sales

Accolades

Awards and nominations

Rankings

Release history

Notes

References

2014 EPs
T-ara albums
Genie Music EPs
Korean-language EPs